Proxicharonia is a genus of sea snails, marine gastropod molluscs in the family Cymatiidae.

Species
The only species within the genus Proxicharonia is:
 Proxicharonia palmeri Powell, 1967

References

 Powell A W B, New Zealand Mollusca, William Collins Publishers Ltd, Auckland, New Zealand 1979 .

Cymatiidae
Gastropods of New Zealand
Monotypic gastropod genera